"Candidatus Caballeronia mamillata" is a bacterium from the genus of Burkholderia and the family Burkholderiaceae.

References

Burkholderiaceae
Bacteria described in 2011
Candidatus taxa